Gary Bodeau is a Haitian politician who served as President and Speaker of the Chamber of Deputies of Haiti.

References 

Members of the Chamber of Deputies (Haiti)
Year of birth missing (living people)
Living people